Šavnik Municipality is one of the municipalities of Montenegro. The municipality is located in northwestern part of Montenegro, being part of Durmitor region. The administrative center is small town of Šavnik.

Geography and location
Šavnik is located at the confluence of three rivers - Bukovica, Bijela and Šavnik, at an altitude of 840 meters. The municipality is located in north-western region of Montenegro in the Drobnjaci region, named after the local clan of Drobnjaci. Population of Šavnik and entire municipality is since in slow but steady decline. Most of the residents are migrating to Nikšić and southern Montenegro, and Šavnik is often a synonym for a poor and deteriorating town. Šavnik is situated on a regional road between Nikšić (45 km) and Žabljak (15 km), and it is its only link with the rest of Montenegro.

Municipal parliament
The municipal parliament consists of 30 deputies elected directly for a four-year term.

Population
Town of Šavnik is administrative centre of Šavnik municipality, which has 2,947 residents. The town of Šavnik itself has a population of 570. Šavnik municipality has the smallest population of all municipalities of Montenegro. The town of Šavnik is also the seat of municipality in Montenegro with fewest residents.

Population of Šavnik:
March 3, 1981 - 633
March 3, 1991 - 821
November 1, 2003 - 570

Ethnic groups (2003 census): 
Montenegrins (58,94 %)
Serbs (30.0%)

Gallery

References

 
Municipalities of Montenegro